A  is a sacred formula or inspired utterance considered in Zoroastrianism to have spiritual power. Their use already goes back to Zarathustra who described himself in his Gathas as a knower of mantras.

Zoroastrian mantras are etymologically and functionally related to the mantras known from the Vedic tradition. However, they are not derived from Vedic mantras, but represent an independent, parallel development.

Etymology 
Together with the Vedic term , they go back to a common, Proto-Indo-Iranian *mantram, which in turn is derived from the reconstructed Proto-Indo-European verb *men (to think) and the instrumental suffix *-trom. By combining verb and suffix, the word *mantram, therefore, acquires the meaning instrument of thinking.

Within the context of Zoroastrianism,  is commonly translated as mantra. Yet this is not universally applied, and others have translated it as holy spell, religious utterance or formula, while some leave it untranslated altogether.

Usage 
In the Zoroastrian tradition, a mantra is a usually shorter, inspired utterance recited during religious rituals such as prayers. They can be distinguished from the longer, commonly eight-syllabic hymns of praise (called Yasht in the Avesta) as well as the typically eleven-syllabic songs (called Gathas in the Avesta as well as in the Vedas). The use of mantras in Zoroastrianism goes back to Zarathustra, who describes in the Gathas (Y. 50.5-50.6) his function as a prophet of Ahura Mazda explicitly as a knower of mantras.

The Avesta connects mantras with a wide range of positive qualities. For instance, in the Warharan Yasht, they are praised as "awful and powerful, awful and assembly-ruling, awful and victorious, awful and healing" (Yt. 14. 46). Yet the most praise is reserved for the Ahuna Vairya, the Ashem Vohu, the Yenghe hatam, and the Airyaman ishya, which are considered the most important mantras in Zoroastrianism. Zoroastrian tradition considers the potency of a mantra to be dependent on their correct recitation. As a result, they have survived largely intact to this day, although for a long time their transmission was exclusively oral.

In the later Avestan texts, mantras sometimes became personified through the Zoroastrian divinity of Mantra Spenta, the mantra (which is) holy/bounteous/furthering. The Avesta describes Mantra Spenta as emanating directly from Ahura Mazda and returning to him through the mantras spoken by priests and poets. In the Zoroastrian calendar, the 29th day of the month is dedicated to this divinity.

Comparison to Vedic Mantras 
The use of mantras in Zoroastrianism represents a parallel development to the Vedic tradition and must, therefore, go back to the common Indo-Iranian period when the people of the Avesta and the people of the Vedas formed a single people. Investigating their commonalities is therefore important to understand the poetic and religious traditions of the early Indo-Iranians. These similarities are found in the social, economic and religious sphere of the Avestan and Vedic people.

Such similarities are found for example in fixed expression like 'true mantra' or 'to fashion the mantra'. Moreover, both the Vedic and Avestan mantras show a number of functional similarities. One is the notion that if truth is properly expressed in the mantra, it can compel a divinity to comply with the speaker's request. Another similarity is the Vedic and Avestan connection of mantras to paths, such that a properly articulated mantra may open a path to the divinity that is addressed. Moreover, both traditions consider the mantras to be fashioned from the heart since this was considered to be the seat of thought. Mantras during the Proto-Indo-Iranian period may, therefore, have represented the power of speech in "creating, conveying, concentrating and realizing intentional and efficient thought [to] identifying oneself with the essence of the divinity[.]"

See also
 Mantra
 Jesus Prayer

References

Notes

Citations

Bibliography 

 
 
 
 

 
 
 
 
 
 
 
 
 
 

 

Ancient history of Iran
Zoroastrianism
Avestan language